Morro da Igreja ( "Hill of the Church") is a peak situated in Urubici, a municipality of the Santa Catarina state, in southern Brazil. Its latitude is 28º07'31" S and its longitude is 49º29'38" W, with an elevation of 1,822 metres (5,977 feet), the highest inhabited point and the second most elevated of this state. 

This peak registered the lowest (unofficial) temperature in Brazil: -17.8 °C (0 °F), on June 29, 1996. It is considered the coldest place in this country; tourism is popular in the winter, when snowfalls can occur.

Officially, there is a 1,810 meter weather station by Epagri/Ciram<ref>(in Portuguese) [https://ciram.epagri.sc.gov.br/agroconnect/# Epagri/Ciram - Agroconnect website]</ref> the record low was registered on August 21, 2020, by a 2 centimeter snowy cold snap. It was a -8.6°C (17°F) windy and CAVOK morning, with a high of -1.2°C (30°F) in the afternoon, actually the second lowest high. The absolute 24-hour lowest high ever registered is -2.3°C (28°F), on July 23, 2013, same day of the former record low of -7.8°C (18°F). 

The Brazilian Air Force has a military base on the summit equipped with radars and radio relays for air traffic control (CINDACTA) of the Brazilian Southern Region.

There is a curious natural formation in this area, called Pedra Furada (literally Drilled Stone''), and it can be spotted from the peak.

See also
Morro da Boa Vista, the highest peak of Santa Catarina.
Serra do Rio do Rastro

References

External links
  Portal of Morro da Igreja

Mountains of Brazil
Urubici